Uniontown is an unincorporated community in Belmont County, in the U.S. state of Ohio.

History
A post office called Uniontown was established in 1820, and remained in operation until 1912. Besides the post office, Uniontown had several stores, a schoolhouse, and church.

References

Unincorporated communities in Belmont County, Ohio
1820 establishments in Ohio
Populated places established in 1820
Unincorporated communities in Ohio